The Battle of Erzincan was a Russian victory over the Ottoman Empire during the First World War.

In February 1916, Nikolai Yudenich had taken the cities of Erzurum and Trabzon. Trabzon had provided the Russians with a port to receive reinforcements in the Caucasus. Enver Pasha ordered the Third Army, now under Vehip Pasha, to retake Trabzon. Vehip's attack failed and General Yudenich counterattacked on July 2. The Russian attack hit the Turkish communications center of Erzincan forcing Vehip's troops to retreat as well as losing 34,000 men, half taken as POWs. As a result, the Third Army was rendered ineffective for the rest of the year.

Notes

References
 Spencer C. Tucker(Editor), A Global Chronology of Conflict, Volume Four, ABC-CLIO, 2010.
Erzurum-Erzincan

Conflicts in 1916
Battles of the Caucasus Campaign
Battles of World War I involving the Ottoman Empire
Battles of World War I involving Russia
History of Erzincan Province
Erzurum vilayet
1916 in the Ottoman Empire
1916 in the Russian Empire
July 1916 events